La Noche del hurto is a 1976 Argentine comedy film directed by Hugo Sofovich.

Cast
Ricardo Espalter ... Cacho Fortirolo
Javier Portales ... Cholo
Ethel Rojo ... Señora erótica
Cecilia Rossetto ... Juana Fortirolo
Raimundo Soto ... Raimundo
Mario Sánchez ... Carmelo

External links
 

1976 films
Argentine comedy films
Films directed by Hugo Sofovich
1970s Spanish-language films
1970s Argentine films